Cantabrian Unity is a Cantabrian political party based in Torrelavega. It upholds the "Cantabrian Lábaru" as the legitimate flag of Cantabria, and advocates the linguistic integrity of the Cantabrian territory. The party has no defined ideological position. Cantabrian Unity was founded in early 2000 by breakaway members of the Regionalist Party of Cantabria and the defunct Union for the Progress of Cantabria headed by Juan Hormaechea. It is limited to the area of the autonomous Cantabrian community. It has been registered with the Ministry of the Interior since 5 July 2002.

The party participated in municipal elections in Cantabria in 2003, and received nearly 7,000 votes towards the Cantabrian Parliament.

Political parties in Cantabria
Political parties established in 2000
Regionalist parties in Spain
2000 establishments in Spain
Political parties disestablished in 2011
2011 disestablishments in Spain
Defunct political parties in Spain